Julius Caesar (Italian:Giulio Cesare) is a 1914 Italian silent historical film directed by Enrico Guazzoni and starring Amleto Novelli, Bruto Castellani and Pina Menichelli. Taking minor inspiration from William Shakespeare's 1599 play of the same title, the film portrays the events leading up to the assassination of Julius Caesar. In the wake of Guazzoni's internationally successful Quo Vadis it was produced on an epic scale, including vast sets recreating Ancient Rome and more than 20,000 extras.

Plot summary

Cast
 Amleto Novelli as Julius Caesar
 Bruto Castellani
 Irene Mattalia as Servilia
 Ignazio Lupi
 Augusto Mastripietri
 Antonio Nazzari as Brutus
 Gianna Terribili-Gonzales
 Lia Orlandini
 Ruffo Geri
 Pina Menichelli
 Orlando Ricci

References

Bibliography 
 Moliterno, Gino. Historical Dictionary of Italian Cinema. Scarecrow Press, 2008.

External links 
 
 
 

1914 films
Italian historical drama films
Italian silent feature films
1910s Italian-language films
Films directed by Enrico Guazzoni
1910s historical drama films
Films set in ancient Rome
Films set in the 1st century BC
Italian films based on plays
Italian black-and-white films
Films about Julius Caesar
1914 drama films
Articles containing video clips
Silent historical drama films